Nikolai Ilyich Kamov (24 November 1973) was a Soviet aerospace engineer, a pioneer in the design of helicopters, and founder of the Kamov helicopter design bureau.

Biography 
Kamov was born in Russian family, in Irkutsk, but lived in Tomsk until his death on November 24, 1973 in Moscow. He graduated from Tomsk Polytechnic University with an engineering degree in 1923.

Kamov worked with Dmitry Grigorovich and later - for TsAGI. In 1940 he was assigned to establish the new helicopter OKB which was later named after him.

Memory 

 Buried at the Novodevichy Cemetery, Moscow
 Since 1992 one of the two main Soviet-Russian helicopter manufacturers bears a surname of Nikolai Kamov

See also 
 List of Kamov aircraft

References 

1902 births
1973 deaths
20th-century Russian engineers
People from Irkutsk
People from Irkutsk Governorate
Central Aerohydrodynamic Institute employees
Tomsk Polytechnic University alumni
Heroes of Socialist Labour
Recipients of the Order of Lenin
Recipients of the Order of the Red Banner of Labour
Recipients of the USSR State Prize
Russian aerospace engineers
Russian mechanical engineers
Soviet aerospace engineers

Soviet mechanical engineers
Burials at Novodevichy Cemetery